Victor Villiger (1 September 1868 – 10 June 1934) was a Swiss-born German chemist and the discoverer of the Baeyer-Villiger oxidation.

Life
He studied at University of Geneva and, following his graduation, began his doctoral studies with Adolf von Baeyer at the University of Munich.

He started working at BASF in Ludwigshafen in 1905.

References

1868 births
1934 deaths
People from Cham, Switzerland
20th-century German chemists
University of Geneva alumni
Ludwig Maximilian University of Munich alumni